Decatur Public Schools may refer to:

 Decatur Public Schools District 61, a school district in Macon County, Illinois
 Decatur Public Schools (Michigan), a school district in Van Buren County, Michigan
 Decatur City Schools, a school system in Morgan and Limestone counties, Alabama
 City Schools of Decatur, a school district in DeKalb County, Georgia